National Pet Month is a celebration of the benefits that pets bring to people's lives - and vice versa. It is observed annually in the United States in May and during the month of April in the United Kingdom.

The Campaign Is Coordinated By National Office Of Animal Health (NOAH) And Pet Food Manufacturers’ Association (PFMA)

Purpose
National Pet Month’s aims are to:
 Promote the benefits of pet ownership
 Support pet adoption
 Make people aware of the benefits of pets for people and people for pets
 Increase public awareness of services available from professionals who work with animals
 Raise awareness of the role, value and contribution to society of working companion animals

References

External links
 National Pet Month (UK)

April observances
May observances
Month-long observances
Pets